Chal Chalein is a 2009 Indian Hindi-language film directed by Ujjwal Singh and produced by Mahesh Padalkar, starring Mithun Chakraborty, Rati Agnihotri, Mukesh Khanna and Kanwaljeet Singh in a story about the academic pressures on children.

Plot 

A student commits suicide because of extreme anxiety over pressure from his dad to get good grades. The student's empathetic friends enlist the help of a lawyer named Sanjay (Mithun Chakraborty) to speak up against the parents, the government and the school system. The case draws national attention and generates massive public opinion.

Production

Chakraborty (prosecuting lawyer) worked again with his 1980s romantic films co-star Rati Agnihotri (student's mother). Their previous films included Pasand Apni Apni, Shaukeen, and Boxer.

Cast 

Mithun Chakraborty as Prosecuting Lawyer
Mukesh Khanna as Justice Bharat Kumar
Rati Agnihotri as Student's mother
Nishikant Dixit as Father
Syed Hussain Haider Abidi as Sunny
Tanvi Hegde as Vaishnavi
Shilpa Shukla
Kanwaljeet Singh
Vishwajeet Pradhan
Anup Soni
Anand Abhyankar

Soundtrack

Maestro Illayaraja provided the film score for this film and lyrics penned by Piyush Mishra.

Track listing

External links 
 Chal Chalein at Bollywood Hungama

2009 films
2000s Hindi-language films
Films about the education system in India
Films scored by Ilaiyaraaja